The 1978–79 Úrvalsdeild karla was the 28th season of the Úrvalsdeild karla, the top tier men's basketball league on Iceland. The season started on 14 October 1978 and ended on 29 March 1979. KR won its 7th title by posting the best record in the league. It secured the title by beating Valur, 77–75, in the last game of the season.

Competition format
The participating teams first played a conventional round-robin schedule with every team playing each opponent twice "home" and twice "away" for a total of 20 games. The top team won the national championship whilst the bottom team was relegated to Division I.

Regular season

Notable occurrences
On 19 March, fights broke out during Valur's 92–79 victory against Njarðvík. A Njarðvík's official, Kristbjörn Albertsson, was tossed from the game after running onto the court to challenge the referees following Valur's Tim Dwyer elbow to Njarðvík's Árni Lársson head. After the game ended, fights broke out in the stands and spilled out to the court. Fans and Njarðvík's officials harassed the referees, ending with referee Þráinn Skúlason being hit in the head. In the aftermath, Njarðvík's coach Hilmar Hafsteinsson was suspended for 4 games while player Ted Bee received a 1-game suspension. Njarðvík was furthermore fined 20.000 ISK.
On 23 March, Valur set a new league scoring record in its 143–78 victory against Þór Akureyri.

References

External links
Official Icelandic Basketball Association website
1978-1979 Úrvalsdeild statistics

Icelandic
Úrvalsdeild karla (basketball)